Mario Montenegro (born Roger Collin Macalalag; July 25, 1928 – August 27, 1988) was a Filipino film actor best known for his heroic leading roles.

Early life
Montenegro was born in Pagsanjan, Laguna

Montenegro was a Fine Arts student at the University of the Philippines upon the invasion of the Philippines by Japan during World War II. At the age of fourteen, he joined the armed resistance against the Imperial Japanese Army as a member of the Hunters ROTC guerilla unit. He was only sixteen when he, along with the Hunters ROTC, participated in the famed raid on the Japanese internment camp at Los Baños, Laguna on February 23, 1945. He received multiple medals for distinction before he rejoined civilian life in 1946.

Film career
In 1949, Montenegro was cast in his first film role in the World War II drama Capas. The following year, he was cast by director Manuel Conde in his first leading role, in Apat na Alas (1950).

During the 1950s, Montenegro was among the mainstays of LVN Pictures studio headed by Doña Sisang de León. He was often cast in costume dramas and action films, dabbling occasionally in comedy roles. He portrayed heroic leads in such historical films as Dagohoy (1953), Lapulapu (1955), Kilabot ng Makiling (1959) and Alyas Sakay (1959). Throughout his career, Montenegro would be nominated for a total of three FAMAS acting awards, including two Best Actor nominations.

As he aged, Montenegro found himself cast in character roles. Among his more notable later roles was in Mike de Leon's Itim (1976), for which he received a Best Supporting Actor nomination from the Gawad Urian.

His last movie was Madonna: Ang Babaeng Ahas, filmed in 1988, but it was released posthumously in 1991.

Death
Montenegro died of a heart attack on August 20, 1988 in Manila, Philippines.

Legacy
His surviving granddaughter Valeen Montenegro is also an actress following the footsteps of his legacy.

Filmography

Notes

References

External links

1928 births
1988 deaths
20th-century Filipino male actors
Filipino male film actors
Filipino people of Spanish descent
Filipino people of French descent
Male actors from Laguna (province)
Paramilitary Filipinos